The 1980 East Tennessee State Buccaneers football team was an American football team that represented East Tennessee State University as a member of the Southern Conference (SoCon) during the 1980 NCAA Division I-A football season. Led by third-year head coach Jack Carlisle, the Buccaneers compiled and overall record of 2–9, with a mark of 1–4 in conference play, placing seventh in the SoCon.

Schedule

References

East Tennessee State
East Tennessee State Buccaneers football seasons
East Tennessee State Buccaneers football